The Central Conservatory of Music is a prestigious leading public music school of China and a member of Double First Class University Plan and former Project 211. Its campus is in the Xicheng District of Beijing, China, near Fuxingmen Station. It is a Chinese state Double First Class University, identified by the Ministry of Education.

Overview
Founded in 1950 the conservatory offers courses to both citizens and foreign students. The school caters to all levels from primary to postgraduate.  Undergraduate programmes of four or five years are offered in composition, conducting, musicology, voice and opera, piano, orchestral instruments and traditional Chinese musical instruments. There's a six-year middle school with courses in piano, orchestral instruments, traditional instruments and music theory and two primary schools cater to full-time and evening students.  There is also an evening university for mature students.

In recent years, the conservatory has developed strong relationships with overseas institutions and individuals.  Foreign musicians and scholars are frequently invited to teach or offer lectures at the conservatory which, in turn, sends its own faculty members and students to other countries to pursue further studies, lecture or give performances. Conservatory students and teachers participate in the China Youth Symphony Orchestra, the Chinese Traditional Musical Instruments Ensemble, the Conservatory Students Chorus, the Middle School Students Orchestra and the Primary School Students Performing Group.

The conservatory campus covers 53,000 square metres.  The Conservatory Music Library accommodates over 500,000 volumes and is the largest of its kind in China. The conservatory also owns over 500 pianos and a large number of musical instruments. Educational facilities include an electronic music studio with advanced recording and video equipment and a violin workshop. New: 1 Oberlinger-organ from Germany Nov. 2013

The conservatory publishes the Journal of the Central Conservatory of Music. It is generally considered to be the top Chinese academic journal in the field of musicology.

Degrees offered
Bachelor's degrees (4 years)
 Musicology (5 years)
 Composition and Compositional Theory (5 years)
 Vocal Singing (5 years)
 Conducting (5 years)
 Keyboard Instruments Performance
 Wind and Stringed (Percussional) Instruments Performance
 Chinese Musical Instruments Performance
 The Arts of Instruments Making and Repair

Master's degrees (3 years)
 Musicology
 Composition and Compositional Theory
 Vocal Singing
 Conducting
 Keyboard Instruments Performance (4 years)
 Wind and Stringed (Percussional) Instruments Performance (4 years)
 Chinese Musical Instruments Performance (4 years)
 The Arts of Instruments Making and Repair (4 years)

Doctoral degrees (3 years)
 Musicology
 Composition and Compositional Theory

Notable alumni

See also
China Conservatory of Music

References

External links
 Central Conservatory of Music website
 Campus real three-dimensional map

 
Educational institutions established in 1950
Universities and colleges in Beijing
Music schools in China
1950 establishments in China
Schools in Xicheng District